Georgia women's national floorball team is the national team of Georgia. , the team was ranked fifteenth by the International Floorball Federation.

References 

Women's national under-19 floorball teams
F